Nura Amin (born 4 July 1970) is an Egyptian novelist, short story writer, and translator.

A native of Cairo, Amin received her bachelor's degree in French from Cairo University in 1992, and has since worked as a teaching assistant at the Academy of Arts, in the Center for Languages and Translation. She has published a number of translations into Arabic from English and French. As a writer, she received the short-story prize from the General Authority for Culture Palaces in 1996; three years later she won the prize for the best novel by a writer under the age of forty which was offered by the Andalusiya Foundation for Culture and Arts. Amin has also been active as a film, theater, and literary critic for Al Ahali and for al-Hilal.

References

1970 births
Living people
Egyptian women short story writers
Egyptian women journalists
Egyptian novelists
Egyptian translators
Egyptian women novelists
Egyptian short story writers
Egyptian film critics
Egyptian literary critics
Women literary critics
20th-century Egyptian women writers
20th-century Egyptian writers
20th-century journalists
20th-century short story writers
20th-century translators
20th-century novelists
21st-century Egyptian women writers
21st-century Egyptian writers
21st-century short story writers
21st-century journalists
21st-century translators
Writers from Cairo
Cairo University alumni
French–Arabic translators
English–Arabic translators
Women film critics